Rukometni klub Derventa (Serbian Cyrillic: Рукометни клуб Дервента) is a handball club from Derventa, Republika Srpska, Bosnia and Herzegovina. Currently, RK Derventa competes in the Handball Championship of Bosnia and Herzegovina and the Handball Cup of Bosnia and Herzegovina.

Recent seasons

The recent season-by-season performance of the club:

Key

References

External links
Official Facebook page 
Official Twitter page 

Bosnia and Herzegovina handball clubs